Walter William "Chip" Hale (born December 2, 1964) is an American professional baseball infielder, coach, and manager. Hale played in Major League Baseball (MLB) from 1989 through 1997, and  managed in MLB from 2015 through 2016. He was named head coach of the Arizona Wildcats of the University of Arizona in July 2021.

Hale played in MLB for the Minnesota Twins and Los Angeles Dodgers, mostly as a second baseman and third baseman. He became a coach for the Arizona Diamondbacks in 2007, and has since served as a coach for the New York Mets, Oakland Athletics, Washington Nationals, and Detroit Tigers. He managed the Diamondbacks in 2015 and 2016.

Playing career
Born in San Jose, California, Hale played baseball for Campolindo High School in Moraga, California. He attended the University of Arizona, where he played college baseball for the Arizona Wildcats. He was a part of the 1986 College World Series champions. He also set school records in hits and walks for a career. In 1984 and 1985, he played collegiate summer baseball for the Orleans Cardinals of the Cape Cod Baseball League and was named a league all-star in 1985.

The Minnesota Twins selected Hale in the 17th round, with the 425th overall selection, of the 1987 Major League Baseball draft. He signed with the Los Angeles Dodgers as a free agent prior to the  season, and appeared in 14 games for the Dodgers, in what would be his final major league season.

Hale is associated with one of the most famous bloopers in baseball history. On May 27, 1991, while playing for the Class AAA Portland Beavers, Hale hit a deep fly ball to right field where Vancouver Canadians outfielder Rodney McCray ran through the outfield wall attempting to catch the ball.

Coaching career
Hale joined the Arizona Diamondbacks organization as the manager of the Missoula Osprey for the 2000 season. He managed the El Paso Diablos in 2002 and the Tucson Sidewinders from 2004 to 2006. Under Hale's leadership the minor league Sidewinders finished the regular season with a record of 91–53, a new franchise record; and Hale was named Pacific Coast League Manager of the Year.

For the 2007 Major League Baseball season, Hale served as a coach for the Arizona Diamondbacks under manager Bob Melvin.

In 2009, Hale was hired as the third base coach for the New York Mets.  He was a candidate to become manager of the Mets after Jerry Manuel was fired at the end of the 2010 season; however, the position went to Terry Collins.

On October 5, 2011, Hale signed a two-year deal to become bench coach of the Oakland Athletics. On the same day, the Mets announced that Hale would not be returning to the league club for the 2012 season and would be replaced by Tim Teufel.

On May 29, 2013, Hale was ejected for the first time in his MLB playing or coaching career for arguing a spectator interference and runner placement call. Brian Knight was the ejecting umpire.

Hale then went back to the Arizona Diamondbacks during the 2015 and 2016 seasons as the club's manager, compiling a 148–176 record. He was fired from the managerial position on October 3, 2016.

Hale was re-hired by the Oakland Athletics on October 18, 2016, this time as the team's third-base coach.

Then, in November 2017, the Washington Nationals hired Hale as their bench coach. On October 29, 2019, in Game 6 of the World Series, he became the acting manager for the Nationals after Dave Martinez was ejected in the 7th inning. Hale and the Nationals maintained their lead, garnering a 7-2 win to force a Game 7, thus paving the way to winning the franchise’s first World Championship, the following night.

On November 7, 2020, Hale was named the third base coach for the Detroit Tigers.

On July 5, 2021, Hale left the Tigers so he could become the head baseball coach at the University of Arizona.

Managerial record

Head coaching record

References

External links

1964 births
Living people
Albuquerque Dukes players
Arizona Diamondbacks coaches
Arizona Diamondbacks managers
Arizona Wildcats baseball players
Baseball coaches from California
Baseball players from San Jose, California
Detroit Tigers coaches
Kenosha Twins players
Los Angeles Dodgers players
Minnesota Twins players
Major League Baseball bench coaches
Major League Baseball designated hitters
Major League Baseball second basemen
Major League Baseball third base coaches
Major League Baseball third basemen
Memphis Redbirds players
Minor league baseball managers
New York Mets coaches
Oakland Athletics coaches
Orlando Twins players
Orleans Firebirds players
Portland Beavers players
Salt Lake Buzz players
Washington Nationals coaches
Arizona Wildcats baseball coaches